Goruh-e Sarhangcheh (also Romanized as Gorūh-e Sarhangcheh) is a village in Garmsir Rural District, in the Central District of Ardestan County, Isfahan Province, Iran. At the 2006 census, its population was 40, in 9 families.

References 

Populated places in Ardestan County